Fossel is a surname. Notable people with the surname include:

Jon S. Fossel (born 1942), American politician
Michael Fossel (born 1950), American professor of clinical medicine and author

See also
Fassel, surname
Kossel